The 2019 NCAA Division III Cross Country Championships was the 47th annual NCAA Men's Division III Cross Country Championship and the 39th annual NCAA Women's Division III Cross Country Championship to determine the team and individual national champions of NCAA Division III men's and women's collegiate cross country running in the United States. In all, four different titles were contested: men's and women's individual and team championships..

The women's race team title was won by Johns Hopkins, their 6th title (and 3rd title in the previous 4 years). The women's individual title was won by Parley Hannah of Ithaca, becoming the first Bomber to win the women's race in program history. In the men's race, the team title was won by Pomona-Pitzer, their 1st title. The men's individual title went to Patrick Watson Stevenson, becoming the first ever individual national champion for his school

Women's title
Distance: 6,000 meters

Women's Team Result (Top 10)

Women's Individual Result (Top 10)

Men's title
Distance: 8,000 meters

Men's Team Result (Top 10)

Men's Individual Result (Top 10)

See also
 2019 NCAA Division I Cross Country Championships
 NCAA Women's Division III Cross Country Championship
 NCAA Men's Division III Cross Country Championship

References 

NCAA Cross Country Championships
NCAA Division III championships
2019 in sports in Indiana